NGC 203 is a lenticular galaxy located approximately 233 million light-years from the Solar System in the constellation Pisces. It was discovered on December 19, 1873 by Ralph Copeland.

The galaxy is also listed as NGC 211 in the New General Catalogue.

See also 
 Lenticular galaxy 
 List of NGC objects (1–1000)
 Pisces (constellation)

References

External links 
 
 
 SEDS

0203
2393
Lenticular galaxies
Pisces (constellation)
Astronomical objects discovered in 1873
Discoveries by Ralph Copeland